The Farrier Trailertri 720 (also known as Farrier TT720) is a trailerable 1976 trimaran sailboat designed by Ian Farrier that was sold in plan form, targeted at owner builders assembling from marine plywood, and marketed as a day sailer.

See also
List of multihulls
Farrier Marine

References

Trimarans
Sailboat type designs by Ian Farrier
Sailboat types built by Farrier Marine